Wadeville is an unincorporated community in Wood County, West Virginia, United States.

The community most likely was named after one Mr. Wade, who was known to have lived near the town site.

References 

Unincorporated communities in West Virginia
Unincorporated communities in Wood County, West Virginia